Charles Robert Whorwood Adeane  (2 November 1863 – 11 February 1943) was a British army officer.

Background
Adeane was the only son of the politician Henry John Adeane and his wife Lady Elizabeth Philippa Yorke, eldest daughter of Charles Yorke, 4th Earl of Hardwicke. Adeane was educated at Eton College and at Christ Church, Oxford. He received an Honorary Doctorate of Laws by the University of Cambridge.

Career
He served in the British Army and was lieutenant of the 4th Battalion, Suffolk Regiment. During this time Adeane was decorated with the Order of St Sava of Serbia. After his retirement he became Honorary Colonel of the Cambridgeshire Volunteer Regiment. Adeane was justice of the peace and Lord Lieutenant of Cambridgeshire from 1915 until his death in 1943. In 1917, he was appointed President of the Royal Agricultural Society. In the latter year, Adeane was awarded a Companion of the Order of the Bath and in 1920, he was invested as an Officer of the Belgian Order of the Crown.

Family

On 23 July 1888, he married Madeline Pamela Constance Blanche Wyndham, daughter of Hon. Percy Scawen Wyndham, a son of George Wyndham, 1st Baron Leconfield. They had seven children, two sons and five daughters. His daughter Helena Olivia Adeane (1902–1985) was the first wife of William Pleydell-Bouverie, 7th Earl of Radnor and mother of the 8th Earl of Radnor.

His grandson, through his eldest daughter, Pamela, was the jazz musician and broadcaster Humphrey Lyttelton.

His grandson, through his fourth daughter, Lettice, was Sir Timothy Colman  of the Colman's mustard family.

References

1863 births
1943 deaths
Alumni of Christ Church, Oxford
Companions of the Order of the Bath
English justices of the peace
Lord-Lieutenants of Cambridgeshire
People educated at Eton College
Officers of the Order of the Crown (Belgium)
Recipients of the Order of St. Sava
Suffolk Regiment officers
Charles Robert Whorwood
Liberal Party (UK) parliamentary candidates